Santiago Alejandro Alarcón Uribe (born on 23 November 1979 in Medellín, Colombia), is a Colombian actor. He is best known for his role of Germán in the RCN Televisión comedy drama El man es Germán. Later he obtained the leading role of Mauricio Reyna, in the telenovela Las Vega's. And he became more popular for playing the journalist Jaime Garzón, in Garzón vive.

Personal life 
Alarcón has been married to actress Cecilia Navia since 2005, whom she met at an acting academy in 1998. Currently the couple has two children; Matías and María.

Filmography

References

External links 
 

1979 births
Colombian male television actors
21st-century Colombian male actors
Living people